Mucenieks (Old orthography: Mutzeneek; feminine: Muceniece) is a Latvian occupational surname, derived from the Latvian word for "cooper". Individuals with the surname include:
Agata Muceniece (born 1989), Latvian actress, model, and television presenter
Aina Muceniece (1924–2010), Latvian doctor, inventor of the RIGVIR virotherapy
Guntars Mucenieks, Latvian musician from Līvi
Aivars Mucenieks, mayor of Ventspils Municipality, Latvia (as of 2013)  
Elvijs Mucenieks, Latvian sidecarcrosser 
Jēkabs Mucenieks, Brand designer 

Latvian-language masculine surnames
Occupational surnames